Tilbury Juxta Clare is a village and parish in north Essex, England. It is part of the Stour Valley North parish cluster. The church dates back to the 15th century and linked to the De Vere estate at this time. The population quoted includes nearby Ovington.

References

External links

Website for St. Margaret’s Church, Tilbury-juxta-Clare, part of the Upper Colne Valley Parishes

Villages in Essex
Braintree District